Ahuréi (sometimes called Ahurei, Ha'urei or Ha'uréi, latter two also show how it is pronounced), is the capital of Rapa and the rest of the Bass Islands of French Polynesia.  It is located on both sides of the Baie d'Ahuréi.

Ahuréi consists of two suburbs: South Ahuréi, on the south side of the Baie d'Ahuréi, and North Ahuréi, on the north side of the Baie d'Ahuréi.

The town is the southernmost permanently inhabited settlement where French is an official language (not counting settlements with no civilian population).

Climate 

The town features a humid subtropical climate (Köppen Cfa) that closely borders on a tropical rainforest climate (Köppen Af).

References

Geography of the Austral Islands
Populated places in French Polynesia